Givira mucida is a moth in the family Cossidae. It is found in North America, where it has been recorded from California east to south-eastern New Mexico.

The wingspan is 36–40 mm. Adults have been recorded on wing from April to September.

References

Natural History Museum Lepidoptera generic names catalog

Givira
Moths described in 1882